Janet Lee Honour née Janet Oldall (born 1950), is a female former athlete who competed for England.

Athletics career
Honour became the 1967 National champion (under the name Oldall) and the 1971 National champion (under the name Honour) after winning the British AAA pentathlon championship.

In 1970 she competed in the British Commonwealth Games in Edinburgh finishing sixth in the high jump. Four years later she represented England in the 100 metres hurdles and pentathlon events, at the 1974 British Commonwealth Games in Christchurch, New Zealand.

References

1950 births
English female high jumpers
Athletes (track and field) at the 1970 British Commonwealth Games
Athletes (track and field) at the 1974 British Commonwealth Games
Living people
English female hurdlers
British pentathletes
Commonwealth Games competitors for England